Lighthouse on the Shore is an album of American guitarist Norman Blake, released in 1985.

Track listing

Side one

 "Hello Stranger" (Carter Family) – 3:07
 "New Bicycle Hornpipe" (Nancy Blake) – 2:32
 "Marquis of Huntley" (William Marshall, Traditional) – 2:30
 "Belize" (Blake) – 3:40
 "Elzic's Farewell" (Traditional) – 4:23
 "Lighthouse on the Shore" (Blake) – 5:08

Side two

 "President Garfield's Hornpipe" (Traditional) – 2:23
 "If I Lose, I Don't Care" (Traditional) – 3:01
 "Butterfly Weed" (Blake) – 2:54
 "Boston Boy/Last Night's Joy" (Traditional) – 2:21
 "Jordan Am a Hard Road to Travel" (Uncle Dave Macon) – 3:59
 "Peacock's Feather" (Traditional) – 1:42
 "Wildwood Flower" (Carter Family) – 3:17
 "Tennessee Mountain Fox Chase" (Traditional) – 2:50

Personnel
Norman Blake – guitar, vocals, mandola, mandolin, fiddle
Nancy Blake – fiddle, vocals, cello, mandolin
James Bryan – fiddle, viola
Tom Jackson – banjo

1985 albums
Norman Blake (American musician) albums